Don Cornelio y La Zona were a new wave and post punk band, originally from Buenos Aires, Argentina, formed in 1984. After touring the underground circuit, the group released their self-titled debut album in 1987, with great repercussions. It was produced by Andrés Calamaro and had a resounding success thanks to the airplay of the song "Ella vendrá"  (in English: She will come); it was noted for its mixture of sounds with new wave and post punk unconventional instrumentations.

Following the success of its first studio material, the band would release in 1988 their second album, titled Patria o muerte, which made the band popular to the point that they were meant to open for Iggy Pop on a concert of his in the Estadio Obras Sanitarias that same year.

Despite their success, in 1989 the band split, after editing a live album, titled En vivo. In the early 1990s, Palo Pandolfo and Federico Ghazarossian reformed the band under the name of Los Visitantes.

Discography 
Don Cornelio y la Zona (1987)
Patria o muerte (1988)
En vivo (1996)

References

External Links
 

Argentine rock music groups
Argentine post-punk music groups
Argentine new wave musical groups
1984 establishments in Argentina
1989 disestablishments in Argentina
Musical groups established in 1984
Musical groups disestablished in 1989
EMI Latin artists